The 2014 New Mexico State Aggies football team was an American football team that represented New Mexico State University in the 2014 NCAA Division I FBS football season. The Aggies were members of the Sun Belt Conference and played their home games at Aggie Memorial Stadium in Las Cruces, New Mexico. New Mexico State was led by head coach Doug Martin who was in his second year. This was New Mexico State's first time since their 2004 season as members of the Sun Belt Conference (SBC).

This was the first year they started the season 2–0 since the 1999 school year when they started 3–0. However, they lost the following 10 games to finish the season 2–20 overall and 1–7 in Sun Belt play, tying for ninth place.  Tyler Rogers was the team's quarterback.

Schedule

 *-AggieVision games wil air on Altitude or Altitude 2, Comcast New Mexico, ESPN3, and KVIA substations.

Roster

References

New Mexico State
New Mexico State Aggies football seasons
New Mexico State Aggies football